Coimbatore Sundararajan Venkatakrishnan, also known as Venkat, is an American banker. He replaced Jes Staley as the group chief executive (CEO) of the British multinational bank Barclays in November 2021.


Early life and education

Venkat was born in Mysore, India in January 1966. He earned bachelor's, master's and PhD degrees in operations research from the Massachusetts Institute of Technology. His 1991 thesis was entitled "Analysis and Optimization of Terminal Area Air Traffic Control Operations".

Career

Venkat worked for JPMorgan Chase from 1994 to 2016, where he held senior positions in asset management, investment banking, and in risk, rising to chief investment officer for global fixed income, responsible for about  US$200 billion in assets. He joined Barclays in 2016 as chief risk officer, before becoming head of global markets and co-president of BBPLC in October 2020.

Venkat left JPMorgan for Barclays in early 2016, and was among the first people Staley hired when he became CEO of the bank. Venkat was initially the bank's chief risk officer. Venkat had been head of global markets for Barclays, and succeeded Jes Staley with immediate effect after Barclays was notified of the preliminary results from an investigation by the Financial Conduct Authority (FCA) and the Prudential Regulation Authority into "how Staley had characterised his relationship with [Jeffrey] Epstein to Barclays".

Personal life

Venkat is based in New York City. He was diagnosed with non-Hodgkin lymphoma in November 2022, and continued to work while being treated.

References

1960s births
Living people
Year of birth uncertain
Barclays people

Massachusetts Institute of Technology alumni
JPMorgan Chase people
American bankers
People from Mysore
Indian emigrants to the United States